Roger Groome is a Trinidadian former footballer who played in the USL A-League, Canadian Professional Soccer League, and served as a head coach at the college level.

Playing career 
Groome played college soccer in 1998 with Roberts Wesleyan College. In 2002, he played in the USL A-League with Charlotte Eagles, where he appeared in seven matches. He was later loaned to the Ottawa Wizards in the Canadian Professional Soccer League. In his debut season with Ottawa he secured a treble with the organization. After his retirement from professional soccer he made the transition to managing serving as an interim coach for Roberts Wesleyan College, and as an assistant coach for RIT Tigers.

Honors

Ottawa Wizards
CPSL Championship (1): 2002
Open Canada Cup (1): 2002
Canadian Professional Soccer League Eastern Conference Champions (2): 2002

References 

Living people
Trinidad and Tobago footballers
Charlotte Eagles players
Ottawa Wizards players
A-League (1995–2004) players
Canadian Soccer League (1998–present) players
Trinidad and Tobago football managers
Association football defenders
Year of birth missing (living people)